Lee Eun-young is a South Korean taekwondo practitioner. 

She won a gold medal in lightweight at the 1987 World Taekwondo Championships in Barcelona. She won a gold medal at the 1988 Asian Taekwondo Championships, and a gold medal at the 1989 World Taekwondo Championships in Seoul.

References

External links

Year of birth missing (living people)
Living people
South Korean female taekwondo practitioners
World Taekwondo Championships medalists
Asian Taekwondo Championships medalists
20th-century South Korean women